Toscafund Asset Management is a London-based specialist investment firm which is a major investor in Circle Health Ltd.

It has assets of £4 billion.  The Chief Executive is ex Tiger Management employee, Martin Hughes, nicknamed, according to The Times, the 'Rottweiler'.  Dr Savvas P Savouri is the chief economist and a partner in the firm.

It was involved in a long argument with Speedy Hire, where it is a major investor, attempting to replace the chairman, Jan Astrand, whom it accuses of “egregious corporate governance failings”. In September 2017, Toscafund Asset Management launched 300 million euro ($359.34 million) private equity fund that focus on small and mid-sized companies.

In December 2019, Toscafund purchased 12% of Ted Baker following the decline in the company's share price.

In January 2020, Toscafund announced that it owned 11.70% of the Stobart Group, this was subsequently increased to 18.8%.

In December 2020, Toscafund announced that it had sealed a takeover of TalkTalk Group which valued TalkTalk at £1.1 billion, taking it private.  Toscafund was previously TalkTalk's second largest investor.

References

Tiger Management
Investment management companies of the United Kingdom